Greatest Hits is a greatest hits compilation album released by UK duo Lighthouse Family on 18 November 2002 on Wildcard / Polydor. There are two different versions of this album, one with the two bonus tracks, "Lifted" (Linslee Mix) and "End of the Sky", and one without them. This album reached 2× Platinum status in 2014 twelve years after its release.

On 7 April 2003, The Very Best Of was released, containing the same track listing and bonus tracks. The difference is that one can download an additional seven acoustic tracks from a website. This album reached platinum status.

This album contains all the band's singles, plus the album track "End of the Sky", the B-side "Absolutely Everything", a cover version of the Bill Withers song "Ain't No Sunshine" recorded for the Notting Hill soundtrack, and the new song "I Could Have Loved You", which was released as the new single from the album in March 2003.

Track listing

Charts
Greatest Hits

The Very Best Of

Certifications

References

2002 greatest hits albums
2003 greatest hits albums
Lighthouse Family albums
Polydor Records compilation albums
Albums produced by Mike Peden